Since graduating its first class, Sam Houston State University has had many of its former students go on to garner recognition and accolades.

Science and academics
Hiram Abiff Boaz – Bishop; President of Polytechnic College from 1902 to 1911, and of Southern Methodist University, 1920-1922
Willie Dee Bowles – historian of women's suffrage
William "Bill" R. Brinkley – Professor and Dean of the Graduate School of Biomedical Sciences at Baylor College of Medicine
Melinda Estes – neuropathologist and president and chief executive of the Fletcher Allen Health Care corporation

Arts and media
David Adickes – painter; sculptor; creator of '65 Sam Houston statue, President heads at Presidents Park
Jonathan Aibel – screenwriter of Kung Fu Panda and Kung Fu Panda 2 
Dana Andrews – Hollywood actor and president of the Screen Actors Guild, 1963-1965
Frank Bielec – Trading Spaces designer
Katie Rose Clarke – Broadway actor
Roger Creager – country-western musician
Brooke Daniels – Miss Texas USA 2009
Frank Q. Dobbs – writer, director, producer (Streets of Laredo, Gunsmoke)
Dan Dunn – cartoonist, creator of Paintjam
Randy Galloway – writer, Fort Worth Star-Telegram; radio personality ESPN 103.3 
Greg Graham – Broadway choreographer
James Havard – painter and sculptor
Roy Hazelwood – FBI profiler and author
Richard Linklater – Oscar-nominated film director
Steven Long – true crime writer
Debra Maffett  – Miss America, 1983; now host of The Harvest Show on LeSea Broadcasting Network (RTF major)
Emily Neves – voice actor
Dan Rather – newscaster (1953, B.A. Journalism) 
James Surls –  modernist artist
Jack Tinsley – Fort Worth Star-Telegram executive editor who led the paper to two Pulitzer Prizes in the 1980s
Lauren Galley – Author, spokesperson
Joel McDonald – voice actor

Athletics
Walt Anderson – NFL referee (1974) and head referee for Super Bowl XLV
Michael Bankston – professional football player, defensive tackle; 3rd round draft choice in 1991 by the Arizona Cardinals; played ten years in the NFL for AZ, Wash., Cin.
Stan Blinka – linebacker for the NFL's New York Jets
Rhett Bomar – quarterback for the NFL's Minnesota Vikings
Ronnie Carroll – offensive guard for the NFL's Houston Oilers
Tina Chandler – IFBB professional bodybuilder
Keith Davis – former safety for the NFL's Dallas Cowboys
Johnnie Dirden – wide receiver for the NFL's Houston Oilers
Matt Dominguez – wide receiver for the CFL's Saskatchewan Roughriders
Derrick Harris – professional arenafootball2 Rio Grande Valley Dorados player (2006)
Keith Heinrich – tight end for the NFL's Tampa Bay Buccaneers
Phil Hennigan – former Major League Baseball pitcher, Cleveland Indians and New York Mets
Ben Hightower – tight end for the AFL's Cleveland Rams
Hubbard Law – offensive guard for the NFL's Pittsburgh Steelers
Josh McCown – backup quarterback for the NFL's Cleveland Browns
Guido Merkens – quarterback, wide receiver, running back, and defensive back for multiple teams
McNeil Moore – defensive back for the NFL's Chicago Bears
Sam Moore – gridiron football player
Monty Sopp, born Billy Gunn -  professional wrestler
Steve Sparks – professional baseball player (1987)
D.D. Terry – running back for the NFL's Jacksonville Jaguars
George Wright – defensive tackle for the NFL's Baltimore Colts

Politics
Joseph A. Adame – Mayor of Corpus Christi
Kenneth Armbrister – former Texas state senator and director of legislative affairs
Robert Gammage – former US Congressman; former Texas Supreme Court Justice
Lyda Green – retired educator; Republican politician in Alaska
John H. Hannah, Jr. – former United States federal judge
Gibson D. Lewis – former Texas Speaker of the House, the longest serving in state history
Will Metcalf – Republican member of the Texas House of Representatives from District 16, beginning January 2015 (Class of 2006, Criminal Justice)
Borris L. Miles – member of the Texas House of Representatives from District 146
Thaksin Shinawatra – former Prime Minister of Thailand (1979, PhD in Criminal Justice)
Charlie Wilson – member of the United States House of Representatives from Texas's 2nd congressional district
Ralph Yarborough – Texas Democratic politician who served in the United States Senate (1957 to 1971)
 Bill Zedler – member of the Texas House of Representatives from Tarrant County, 2003–2009 and since 2011 ('67 M.B.A.)

Armed services
William F. Garrison – retired Major General of the United States Army; commander of Operation Gothic Serpent, the military operation launched in 1993 to capture Somali warlord Mohamed Farrah Aidid
Hiram "Doc" Jones – Deputy Chief of Chaplains of the United States Air Force
Marcus Luttrell – Navy Cross recipient for his actions in 2005 facing Taliban fighters during Operation Red Wing; co-authored the New York Times bestseller Lone Survivor: The Eyewitness Account of Operation Redwing and the Lost Heroes of SEAL Team 10
J. Michael Myatt – retired Major General of the United States Marine Corps; commanded the 1st Marine Division during Operation Desert Storm in 1990–91; his division liberated Kuwait City; president and CEO of the Marines Memorial Association
Larry Snook – former United States Army Colonel; former Grimes County Judge

References

Sam Houston State University